This is a list of villages in Vestfold, a county of Norway. For other counties see the lists of villages in Norway.

The list excludes cities located in Vestfold.

References

External links

Vestfold